This was the first edition of the event.

Melzer won the title, defeating Víctor Estrella Burgos in the final, 6–1, 6–4.

Seeds

Draw

Finals

Top half

Bottom half

References 
 Main draw
 Qualifying draw

Morelos Open - Singles
Morelos Open